Martin Trümpler (born 13 August 1948) is a retired Swiss football defender and later manager.

References

1948 births
Living people
Swiss men's footballers
BSC Young Boys players
Association football defenders
Swiss football managers
FC Thun managers
BSC Young Boys managers
FC Lausanne-Sport managers